The Akwasidae Festival (alternate, Akwasiadae) is celebrated by the Ashanti people and chiefs in Ashanti, as well as the Ashanti diaspora. The festival is celebrated on a Sunday, once every six weeks.

Observance
The Akan annual calendar is divided into nine months which lasts approximately six weeks but varying between 40 and 42 days in a period; the celebration of this period is called the Adae Festival.  The Adae Festival has two celebration days: the Akwasidae Festival is celebrated on the final Sunday of the period, while the Awukudae Festival is celebrated on a Wednesday within the period. The Friday preceding 10 days to the Akwasidae is called the Fofie (meaning a ritual Friday). As the festival is always held on Sundays (Twi in Kwasidae), its recurrence could be after 40 or 42 days in accordance with the official Calendar of Ashanti. During the last Akwasidae of the year, which coincides with the Adae Kese Festival, special attention is given to make food offerings and donations for helping people.  The festivals of Adae are not interchangeable as they were  fixed from ancient times.

Practices
The rites on this day relate to honouring personal and community ancestors. A gathering called Akom occurs in which drumming, dancing and singing are a normal celebration to honour Abosom (lesser gods in the Akan tradition) and Nsamanfo (spiritually cultivated ancestors). Food offerings include special items such as eto (mashed African yam), garnished with hard-boiled eggs. Every Ashanti celebrates this festival.  For those Ashanti who do not observe the festival of Odwira, the Akwasidae is very important to commemorate their ancestors.

On this day, the Asantehene (King of Ashante) meets his subjects and subordinate chiefs in the courtyard of the Manhyia Palace. The Golden Stool (throne) is displayed at the palace grounds in the presence of the king, and people visit in large numbers, singing and dancing. The king holds his durbar on the occasion of the festival, and people have the liberty to shake hands with him. Before holding the durbar, the king goes in a procession in a palanquin decorated with gold jewelry. He also witnesses a colourful parade, from his palace grounds at Kumasi. Participants of the parade include drum beaters, folk dancers, horn-blowers and singers.  As it is festival of paying respect to ancestors, the king visits the Bantama Mausoleum and offers worship not only to his ancestors' chairs (stools), but also to the skeletal remains of his ancestors.
It is argued that, the king do not worship the stools and the ancestors, however to pay them homage.

See also
 Ashanti Yam Festival
 Adae Festival
 Adae Kese Festival
 Awukudae Festival

References

Bibliography

Ashanti people
Cultural festivals in Ghana
Ashanti Region
Festivals in Ghana